Riverstick is a village in County Cork, Ireland. It lies halfway between Cork City and Kinsale.  The village takes its name from the River Stick which flows through the village. The Irish form of the name, translates as 'ford of the Stick'.

The village has a growing population, and several housing developments were built in the area in the late 20th and early 21st century. During the course of the 20th century, Riverstick supplanted nearby Ballymartle as the major village and population centre in the area. Ballymartle is now little more than a crossroads, although some of the older institutions associated with Riverstick, such as Ballymartle GAA club, still carry the name 'Ballymartle'.

Facilities
There are both Roman Catholic and Church of Ireland churches in the village. Other facilities in the area include one public houses, a grocery store, service station, community hall, fish & chips shop (A&Js), and a pharmacy.

The local Gaelic Athletic Association club is Ballymartle, and the local athletics club is Riverstick-Kinsale AC.

People
Commandant Denny Barry, an Irish Republican, who died on hunger strike during the Irish Civil War was from Riverstick.

See also
 List of towns and villages in Ireland

References

Towns and villages in County Cork